Gurmarin is a 35-residue polypeptide from the Asclepiad vine Gymnema sylvestre (Gurmar). It has been utilized as a pharmacological tool in the study of sweet-taste transduction because of its ability to selectively inhibit the neural response to sweet taste in rats. This rat inhibition appears to have high specificity to sugar (sweetener) molecules like sucrose, glucose, and saccharin as well as the amino acid glycine. As a sweet-taste-suppressing protein, Gurmarin shows signs of being reversible in nature although having little to no effect on the sweet taste sensation in humans suggesting the protein is only active on rodent sweet taste receptors. ref: Appl Microbiol Biotechnol. 2012 Nov;96(3):619-30

References

Protein domains